George W. Bristow (September 23, 1894 – November 12, 1961) was an American jurist.

Born in New Grand Chain, Illinois, Bristow served in the United States Army during World War I. He graduated from University of Illinois and went to Harvard Law School. Bristow was admitted to the Illinois bar in 1920. He lived in Paris, Illinois. Bristow served as state's attorney for Edgar County, Illinois, as master in chancery for Edgar County, and as Edgar County Circuit Court judge. Bristow was a Republican. From 1951 until his death in 1961, Bristow served in the Illinois Supreme Court and was chief justice. Bristow died in the University of Illinois Hospital in Chicago, Illinois after major surgery. Bristow had pancreatic cancer.

Notes

1894 births
1961 deaths
People from Paris, Illinois
People from Pulaski County, Illinois
Military personnel from Illinois
University of Illinois Urbana-Champaign alumni
Harvard Law School alumni
Illinois Republicans
Illinois state court judges
Chief Justices of the Illinois Supreme Court
20th-century American judges
Justices of the Illinois Supreme Court
United States Army soldiers
Deaths from cancer in Illinois
Deaths from pancreatic cancer